Aces High may refer to:

Aces High (comics), a comic book series by EC Comics
Aces High (video game), a combat flight simulator/massively multiplayer online game
Aces High (film), a 1976 film
"Aces High" (music), an orchestral piece by Ron Goodwin, composed for the 1969 film Battle of Britain
Aces High, a 1990 album by Commander Cody and His Lost Planet Airmen
"Aces High" (song), a 1984 song by Iron Maiden
Aces High Light Aircraft, a Canadian ultralight aircraft manufacturer
Aces High, a minigame in Mario Party 3
Aces High, a round in The Big Spin
Aces Up, a solitaire game

See also
 Ace High (disambiguation)